The Opening is a live album by American jazz pianist Mal Waldron featuring a performance recorded in Paris in 1970 and released on the French Futura label.

Track listing
All compositions by Mal Waldron
 "Right On — 7:10  
 "Of Pigs And Panthers" — 9:15  
 "Cry Out" — 3:00  
 "Die Fludel" — 5:10  
 "Petite Gemaux" — 6:40  
 "Sieg Haile" — 10:00 
Recorded at the Centre Culturel Americain in Paris, France, on November 19, 1970.

Personnel
 Mal Waldron – piano

References

Futura Records live albums
Mal Waldron albums
1970 live albums
Solo piano jazz albums